The electoral district of Werribee is an electoral district of the Legislative Assembly in the Australian state of Victoria. It has existed in two incarnations, first from 1976 to 2002, and was created again in the 2013 redistribution and came into effect at the 2014 state election.

Based on the rapidly growing outer south west suburbs of Melbourne, it takes in areas from Tarneit and Lara. It covers the suburbs of Werribee, Wyndham Vale, and the rural areas surrounding these suburbs to the south and west.

Werribee was estimated to be a safe Labor seat with a margin of 11.4%, and was held by Labor with a further 4.2% swing towards them at the 2014 state election.

Members

Election results

References

External links
 District profile from the Victorian Electoral Commission

Electoral districts of Victoria (Australia)
1976 establishments in Australia
2002 disestablishments in Australia
2014 establishments in Australia
Werribee, Victoria
City of Wyndham
Electoral districts and divisions of Greater Melbourne